The Gogiida are an order of early echinoderms known from late Early to Middle Cambrian deposits.

References

Fossil taxa described in 1982
Cambrian first appearances
Cambrian extinctions
Blastozoa
Prehistoric animal orders
Echinoderm orders